Frías is a town located in the northern part of the province of Burgos, in Castile and León, Spain. In 2010 it had a population of only 275 inhabitants.

Frías is a historic medieval town on a hill above the river Ebro, which has been a strategic point to cross river Ebro in the routes communicating with the Cantabrian Sea. Today the town is a popular tourist spot. It has an impressive castle dominating the river and the twelfth-century bridge across it. It is considered to be the smallest "city" in Spain, having been given that title in 1435.

There are two convents and two churches in the town. The gothic church of San Vitores is particularly worth visiting.

Geography

Ubication 
Frías is around 80 km northeast of Burgos, in river Ebro shore. Its county territory has  29,37 km2.

Main sights 
 Frias Castle (12th–15th century).
 Hanging houses.
 The medieval bridge. Near the town, crossing the Ebro river, a 12th-century bridge with a defensive tower that dates from the 14th century.
 San Vitores church.

Politics 
Frías has been usually ruled by the Socialist Party (PSOE). From 2007 to 2015 the Major has been Luis Arranz from People's Party (PP). In 2007 reaching an agreement with the left party IU, and in 2011 with absolute majority. In the May 2015 elections, PSOE recovered the power with absolute majority, as repeated in 2019 elections.

Elections results 2019 

 PSOE: 99 votes, 5 seats
 PP: 43 votes, 2 seats

Heritage 

The medieval old town has been declared Conjunto Histórico and retains its urban structure and special construction features.

Hanging houses 

These houses, with ground floor and two or three additional floors and, eventually a wine cellar, are supported by each other, creating streets at different height. In some cases these house hang from the rock. Their structure is made of walls of limestone within a wood structure.

The houses are located in the streets that climb the hill with Velasco's Castle and San Vicente church. A wall partially surrounds the old town and two arches from the three initially erected: puerta del Postigo and puerta de Medina.

These arches are also made of limestone and wood, materials that makes them to camouflage in the rock. The are placed in Obdulio Fernández Street and can be contemplated from the streets: "Antonio Carpintero, Mayor de San Vitores, Federico Keller and Campa de las eras."

Salazar Palace and barracks 

This building is placed in Alfonso VIII Square, close to the castle. Initially was the palace of the Salazar's family, and a coat of arms can be found over its door with the thirteen stars of the Salazar's. A Saint Francis lace surrounds the stars. Later it has been used as residential barracks and today is the Tourism Office of Frías.

Roman Road 

An important Roman road connecting the Castilian plateau and the north of Spain cross Frías by a ford of Ebro River 500 meters east of the Romanic bridge. In addition, Frías was also the beginning of another Roman road connecting this area with La Rioja. It passes by La Canaleja, Rueda, Ronda, Rincón de Soto and Calzada streets.

Medieval Bridge 

Frías' medieval bridge is 143 meters in length and has 9 arches. It was built in a Romanic style, and refurbished in the 14th century when a defensive tower with arrow-holes and battlements were built in the center. This tower also functioned as a medieval toll point called “cobro del pontazgo”. The bridge connects Avenida del Salero and Avenida de Santa María del Puente.

Jewish quarter 

The Jewish quarter, almost unknown until the final decades of the 20th century, was important in its time. Mentions of Jewish inhabitants during the 14th century can be found in the cartulary of Santa María de Vadillo, although there are references even from the previous century. For instance, in 1387, someone called Nahamías was recognized as a neighbor. Even in 1574 in some documents the converted “tax collector of Frías” from the mid 15th century, Juan Sanz de la Ussa, was recalled, wondering if he had been executed or forgiven. Juan Sanz de la Ussa worked as a tax collector for the Velasco family and founded the Visitación chapel. The Jewish quarter was located on calle Convenio and calle Virgen de la Candonga.

Duke of Velasco or Frias Castle 

On the top of “La Muela” hill, its strategic position provides a privileged view of the valley and the bridge19.8M over Ebro River. It is one of the most remarkable rock castles of Spain.

The first mention to the castle dates back 867. What can be seen today was built in the last years of the 12th century and beginning of the 13th century, under the reign of Alfonso VIII. The castle has a main defensive function. The tower keep is detached of the rest of the castle, with its own defensive system.

A bridge over the moat (originally a drawbridge) gives access to the main door. Defense is based on the strategic location of the tower keep on the top of a big rock. High walls with battlements and arrow-holes protect the entire castle. Around the parade ground, rest of the original buildings like barns or cellars can be found.

The tower keep can be visited, and from its top visitors can find the best views of the city and its environment. This tower has partially collapsed at least three times in history, last time in 1830, with a death toll of 30 people. This event was related with the explosion of the wall by the French army under Napoleon.

Other monuments 

 San Francisco Convent building from the 14th century. Initially built as a convent, it has been used for different purposes, such as private housing.
 Santa María de Vadillo Convent erected in 1219 by Diego Faro, was the home of an Augustinian community. Was also used as a hospital. It style combines gothic and renaissance, like the well-preserved church. After the Confiscation of Mendizábal in 1833, it was abandoned.
 San Vítores Church built between 13th and 14th centuries in Gothic style.

Notable people 
 Manuel Bernal de Huidobro (1656–1716), general and governor of Sinaloa (Mexico) from 1734 to 1741.
 Pedro Fernández de Frías: Great Cardinal of Spain and Bishop of y Osma.

Gallery

References

External links 
 http://www.ciudaddefrias.es/

Municipalities in the Province of Burgos